The 275 kV Forth Crossing has the tallest electricity towers (pylons )in Scotland. They stand next to the Clackmannanshire Bridge and the Kincardine Bridge, and cross the River Forth.
The tower at the southern end is 153.9 metres (505 ft), that at the northern end 137.16 metres (450 ft) tall.

See also
 400 kV Thames Crossing
 Aust Severn Powerline Crossing
 Powerline river crossings in the United Kingdom

References

Towers in Scotland
400 kV Forth crossing
Electric power transmission in the United Kingdom
Powerline river crossings